Peoples Democratic Party (PDP), is a political party in Kerala, India. The PDP is known more as the party led by Abdul Nazer Mahdani, a popular Muslim leader in Kerala.

PDP in Kerala politics

Alliances 
PDP formed an alliance with Left Democratic Front (LDF) in Kerala. The alliance proved to be a disaster with poor performance of LDF. The alliance fell apart following arrest of Abdul Nazer Mahdani in 2010 August by Karnataka Police for 2008 Bangalore serial blasts.

Parliament Election 
In the 1996 Indian general election the party has contested seven constituencies. In the 2004 Indian general election, PDP contested independently from Ponnani (Lok Sabha constituency) and its candidate U. Kunhimohammed has won nearly 45,000 votes.

In the 2009 Parliament Election of India, PDP which was in alliance with the ruling Left Democratic Front (LDF) in Kerala contested from Ponnani (Lok Sabha constituency) with Hussein Randathani as its candidate.

Assembly Elections 
In the 1996 Kerala Legislative Assembly election, PDP contested in 50 constituencies. In 2016 Kerala Legislative Assembly election party fielded candidates in 60 constituencies.

Local Elections 
The vice chairman of party, Poonthura Siraj has won as councilor in Thiruvananthapuram Corporation in 1995 and 2000.

References

Political parties in Kerala
Religiously motivated violence in India
Islamic political parties in India
Political parties established in 1992
1992 establishments in Kerala